Paliyan is a Dravidian language of Kerala that is closely related to Malayalam. It is spoken by the Paliyans.

References

Malayalam language